Lipka (a diminutive form of Polish lipa, meaning "lime tree" (also called linden tree or basswood in North America and different from the citrus lime tree) may refer to:

Places

Poland
 Gmina Lipka, an administrative district) in Złotów County, Greater Poland Voivodeship (west-central Poland)
 Lipka, Złotów County, seat of Gmina Lipka
 Lipka, Lower Silesian Voivodeship (south-west Poland)
 Lipka, Łódź Voivodeship (central Poland)
 Lipka, Lublin Voivodeship (east Poland)
 Lipka, Masovian Voivodeship (east-central Poland)
 Lipka, Kalisz County in Greater Poland Voivodeship (west-central Poland)
 Lipka, Lubusz Voivodeship (west Poland)
 Lipka, Pomeranian Voivodeship (north Poland)
 Lipka, West Pomeranian Voivodeship (north-west Poland)

Other countries
 Lipka, a hamlet of Horní Bradlo, Pardubice Region, Czech Republic

Other uses
 Lipka (surname)
 Lipka (grape), another name for the German wine grape Riesling
 Lipka Tatars

See also